Sumeet Sachdev is an Indian actor and architect known for his role as Gautam Virani in Kyunki Saas Bhi Kabhi Bahu Thi and Abhimanyu Raghav in Yeh Hai Mohabbatein.

Early life and education
Sachdev brought up in Delhi. His younger brother Sandeep was the winner of the Indian Biggest Loser Jeetega. Sachdev is an architect by profession. Sachdev is five days older than his former classmate, Smriti Irani, who played his on-screen mother in Kyunki Saas Bhi Kabhi Bahu Thi.

Career
Sachdev made his acting debut in Aamir Reza Hussain's tribute to Kargil war heroes, The Fifty Days War. He later auditioned for the role of Sahil Virani in the show Kyunki Saas Bhi Kabhi Bahu Thi, but was finalised for another role in the same serial, Gautam Virani. Sachdev gained popularity and recognition for his role as Gomzy and made a prominent position for himself in the Indian television fraternity. Sachdev played a negative character for the first time as Rohit in the serial Kya Haadsa Kya Haqeeqat - Hadsaa. He was finalized to play a negative character for the second time as Swayam in the serial Kahiin To Hoga but resigned due to back problems. Sachdev played the lead male role of Kabir Khan in the first Muslim orientated television serial Khwaish, his character was killed off after only a few months but Sachdev was brought back in another role as Kamran. In November 2009, Sachdev made a comeback in TV after a year's break in Pyaar Ka Bandhan as Raunak. Moreover, Sachdev has been cast as Rudra in the serial  Bandini. He was last seen as Abhimanyu Raghav (Mani) in Yeh Hain Mohabbatein.

Personal life
Sachdev married Amrita Gujral, the head of International Media Marketing at The Times of India on 9 December 2007.
The wedding took place in Gujral's home town of Chandigarh, India.

Filmography

 Television

References

1970s births
Living people
Indian male television actors
Male actors from Delhi
Year of birth missing (living people)